Italian Italo disco duo Righeira have released four studio albums, eight compilation albums, one extended play (EP), 14 singles and three music videos.

Albums

Studio albums

Compilation albums

EPs

Singles

Videography

Documentaries

Music videos

See also 

 List of songs recorded by Righeira

References 

Discography
Discographies of Italian artists
Pop music group discographies